Sosefo Feaomoeata Vakata (born 13 February 1969) is a Tongan politician and former member of the Legislative Assembly of Tonga. He is a former member of the Democratic Party of the Friendly Islands.

He holds a Master of Science degree in Physics from the University of Queensland, and also has an IRB Level 2 Rugby Coaching Certificate; he lists coaching rugby as one of his hobbies. He "taught at Tonga High School for many years", then worked as a civil servant, holding the positions of radio licensing officer and outer islands project manager, then communications engineer, at the Ministry of Information and Communications.

Vakata was elected to the Legislative Assembly for the first time when he won the seat of Ongo Niua 17 in the November 2010 general election as a candidate for the Democratic Party, defeating incumbent independent MP Sione Iloa. On 8 December 2010 it was reported that he had withdrawn his support from the Democratic party and become an independent, and would support a noble candidate as Prime Minister.

At the start of January 2011, when newly elected Prime Minister Sialeataongo Tuivakanō formed his Cabinet, Vakata was appointed Minister for Training, Employment, Youth and Sports. On 1 May 2012, he reshuffled to the position of Minister for Revenue.

In July 2012, Vakata was accused of mis-using government funds allocated to him for expenses during a trip to Australia which was later cancelled.  He denied the allegations, but repaid the money.

In February 2013, he was reshuffled to the position of Minister of Public Enterprises.

Following the 2014 Tongan general election he was appointed to the Cabinet of Akilisi Pōhiva as Minister of Internal Affairs, Women, and Sport. In September 2016 he was dismissed from his Ministerial positions after throwing a wine glass at a senior civil servant.

He was not re-elected at the 2017 election.

References

Members of the Legislative Assembly of Tonga
1969 births
Living people
Government ministers of Tonga
Interior ministers of Tonga
Youth ministers of Tonga
Sports ministers of Tonga
Women's ministers of Tonga
Democratic Party of the Friendly Islands politicians
Independent politicians in Tonga
University of Queensland alumni
People from Niuas